Wim Prinsen (8 March 1945 – 17 December 1977) was a Dutch racing cyclist. He rode in the 1971 Tour de France.

References

1945 births
1977 deaths
Dutch male cyclists
Place of birth missing